Jasmine Lowson (born 1972) is a British actress, journalist and presenter of Singaporean descent.

Early life
Lowson was born in Chatham, Kent, South East England to an English father and a Singaporean mother (née Yam Kheng Chan). She moved to Oxfordshire when she was a year old. When she was 16, her mother remarried and she moved to Bristol and currently resides in London. Her mother and step-father moved to Singapore, when her step-father got a professorship there.

Career

Journalism career
Lowson has reported on Channel 4's The Big Breakfast prior to joining the BBC's Liquid News in September 2003. She became a presenter and reporter for ITN in June 2004; appearing on London Tonight on ITV London, the ITV News Channel and FYI Daily updates on ITV2. She continued to report for London Tonight until September 2012.

References

External links

Jasmine Lowson Linked In

Living people
1972 births
Date of birth missing (living people)
British people of Singaporean descent
British people of Chinese descent
British television presenters
ITN newsreaders and journalists
5 News presenters and reporters